Kabluk is the Russian word for a shoe's heel. It may refer to:

 , a tactical combination in checkers
 Kabluk, the main character from Kabluk of the Eskimo, a 1932 book by Lowell Thomas

See also
 Kapluk, a village in Kenya
 Kablukov (disambiguation)
 Kablukovo